Sergei Mikhailovich Abramov (born 25 March 1957) is a Russian mathematician, Professor, Dr.Sc., Corresponding Member of the Russian Academy of Sciences, Director of the Institute of Program Systems of the Russian Academy of Sciences, Rector of the University of Pereslavl (2003—2017). Specialist in the field of system programming and information technologies (supercomputer systems, telecommunication technologies, theory of constructive metasystems and meta-calculations).

Biography 
He graduated from the faculty MSU CMC (1980).

He defended the thesis «Meta-calculations and their application» for the degree of Doctor of Physical and Mathematical Sciences (1995).

Was awarded the title of Professor (1996), Corresponding Member of the Russian Academy of Sciences (2006).

References

External links 
 
 
 
 Scientific works of Sergei Abramov

Russian computer scientists
Living people
Corresponding Members of the Russian Academy of Sciences
Russian mathematicians
1957 births
Moscow State University alumni